The 1975 World Aquatics Championships took place in Cali, Colombia between July 19 and July 27, 1975, with 682 participating athletes.

Medal table

Medal summary

Diving

Men

Women

Swimming

Men

Women

Synchronised swimming

Water polo
Men

References
HistoFINA - FINA's official historical results documentation - Men
HistoFINA - FINA's official historical results documentation - Women

External links
FINA Official Website
World Swimming Championship Results

 
FINA World Aquatics Championships
World Aquatics
World Aquatics
World
World Aquatics Championships
World Aquatics